Fotouhi is a Persian surname. Notable people with the name include:
 Farshad Fotouhi (1957), American computer scientist
 Mohammad Fotouhi (1990), Iranian fencer

References 

surnames
Persian-language surnames